Sustainability Bonds are fixed-income financial instruments (bonds) where the proceeds will be exclusively used to finance or re-finance a combination of Green and Social Projects and which are aligned with the four core components of the International Capital Market Association (ICMA) Green Bonds Principles and Social Bonds principles.

The main difference among green, social and sustainability bonds, lies in their sustainable categories for the allocation of proceeds, sustainability bonds needing to combine both social and green categories.

The principles (ICMA) 
ICMA principles are currently the most commonly accepted framework for green, social and sustainability bonds’ issuance. They are coordinated by ICMA, which provides not only administrative support but also guidance for their governance process.

The four core components of the principles are:

 Use of proceeds: Identify the set of green and social sustainable categories or list of projects and assets to be financed by the proceeds from the bond issuance.
 Process for project evaluation and selection: The process for selecting and evaluating eligible green and social projects using selection criteria identified by the issuer.
 Management of proceeds: Define the process for tracking, allocating and spending the proceeds of the bond.
 Reporting: Determines ‘what’ and ‘how often’ issuers have to disclose information to investors.

The proceeds of Sustainability Bonds need to be applied in both the Green project and Social project categories.

Green project categories suggested by the principles include:
 Energy
 Buildings
 Transport
 Water management
 Waste management & pollution control
 Nature-based assets including land use, agriculture and forestry
 Industry & energy-intensive commercial
 Information technology & communications (ICT)

Social Project categories suggested by the principles include:
 Affordable basic infrastructure
 Access to essential services
 Affordable housing
 Employment
 Food security and sustainable food systems
 Socioeconomic advancement and empowerment

Other international standards and frameworks examples are the International Climate Bonds Standards  and the ASEAN standards.

Criticism and controversies 

Several authors and studies have raised concerns about the risk of greenwashing, when revenues are not systematically applied to activities with positive environmental outcomes. Further indicating that this risk is accentuated by the lack of a clear and unique definition of what makes a bond "sustainable".

Another criticism is that most of the public and private sector players are more still concerned about the revenue-generating aspects and mainly using the ‘sustainability’ label as a competitive advantage in the business 

A new category of bonds known as sustainability-linked bonds (SLB), tries to overcome these problems by penalizing the issuer with a step-up coupon in case of failing its sustainability performance target(s).

See also 
 Environmental finance
 Bond (finance)
 Climate bond
 Sustainability-linked bond

References

External links
 Sustainability Bonds - Massachusetts Bay Transportation Authority - first non-profit sustainability bonds in the U.S.

Bonds (finance)